There are five French-German secondary schools known in German as  and in French as . DFG/LFAs are highly selective schools of excellence. Their teachers are paid by the French and German states, and tuition is free of charge.

The first DFG/LFA was established in Saarbrücken in 1961 as a cooperation between a French and a German school. In 1972, an agreement signed between France and West Germany formalised the DFG/LFA as a unified school form and introduced the French-German Baccalaureate. This agreement was last complemented by the French-German Schwerin Agreement of 2002. 

The following DFG/LFAs are in operation, two in France:
DFG / LFA Buc (opened in 1975), and

DFG / LFA Strasbourg (2021),

and three in Germany:
DFG / LFA Saarbrücken (1961),
DFG / LFA Freiburg (1972), and

DFG / LFA Hamburg (2020).

Nomenclature 
In German, the DFG/LFA school form is called , like the German secondary school type (years 5 to 12). In French, it is named , after the French school form (years 10 to 12), although the schools also include  (years 6 to 9; see education in France).

In English, one academic study called the school form "French-German School", and its final examinations "French-German Baccalaureate". Other publications in English called the school form "Franco-German" or "French-German high school".

French-German Baccalaureate

Students at DFG/LFA schools complete their education with the bilingual French-German Baccalaureate (deutsch-französisches Abitur / baccalauréat franco-allemand). The first French-German Baccalaureate exam was sat by students of the DFG Saarbrücken in 1972.

Students enter school in separate branches. The French-speaking branch takes seven years and starts with year 6, whereas the German branch commences in year 5 already because German primary school finishes earlier. German speakers complete the French-German Baccalaureate after eight grades, making it an eight-year  (some regular German schools take nine years instead). French-German co-tuition starts in year 6 and increases until year 9 (9. Klasse / troisième).

Years 10 to 12 are taught in equal shares of French and German. For these final years (Oberstufe / second cycle), students are divided into subject-specific branches. They choose between three branches: L (literary sciences), ES (economics and social sciences) and S (maths and natural sciences). The S branch is split into SMP, maths and physics, and SBC, biology and chemistry.  This corresponds to the branch system of the French  prior to the Bac 2021 reform. From the first French-German Baccalaureate in 1972 until 2002, there were only L, SBC and SMP branches. The Schwerin Agreement introduced the ES branch in the 2001-2002 academic year.

DFG/LFA schools use a grade scale from 1 (worst) to 10 (best), which is different from both the German (6 to 1 and 0 to 15) and French scales (0 to 20, respectively). The final  grade is based on grades from years 10 to 12, while the  grade depends solely on final exam performance. The French-German Baccalaureate makes a compromise. Preliminary grades from years 10 to 12 count for 25 percent of the final grade, and final exam performance makes up the remaining 75 percent.

The French-German Baccalaureate is different from and sometimes confused with the AbiBac, a programme offered at regular French and German schools. The AbiBac programme is bilingual to a lesser extent than French-German schools are. It consists of regular  and up to eight hours weekly teaching in French, or regular  with up to eight hours in German.

Other diplomas offered at DFG/LFAs 
The DFG/LFA Buc also offers the diploma Option Internationale du Baccalauréat (OIB) British track, in its Section Internationale Anglophone.

Phase-out of former diplomas 
The DFG/LFA Hamburg was an AbiBac school until 2020, and students admitted until the 2019/20 academic year still sit the AbiBac. The school admitted its first students on the French-German Baccalaureate track in 2020/21, and the first students will graduate with the French-German Baccalaureate in 2028.

The DFG/LFA Strasbourg was previously the German-speaking Section Internationale of the Lycée Vauban, leading to a French Baccalauréat with OIB German. Thus, students who entered prior to the 2020-21 academic year will still graduate with this diploma. They can also switch to the Lycée International des Pontonniers in Strasbourg and do the AbiBac. The first Strasbourg students will graduate with the French-German Baccalaureate in 2029.

French-German  
Regular French schools require their students to sit the Brevet diploma in troisième (year 9) to finish . The same applies to DFG/LFA students in the French branch.

See also 

 European School, a type of school financed by the European Union
 French bi-national high school programmes
AbiBac (French-German)
BachiBac (French-Spanish)
EsaBac (French-Italian)

References

External links

 Governing French-German agreements
 (at German Bundesgesetzblatt)
  (at German Bundesgesetzblatt)
Schwerin Agreement 2002 (at French Legifrance) (at German Bundesgesetzblatt)

Conversion formula: French-German Baccalaureate marks (pass from 6-10) to German KMK Abitur points (pass from 300 to 900) (at KMK)
Conversion table: French-German marks (1-10) to French marks (0-20) (at DFG/LFA Buc)

Gymnasium (school) system
French international schools in Europe
German international schools in Europe
International schools in France
International schools in Germany
Bilingual schools
France–Germany relations